Dr. Ir. Franklin Essed Stadion, formerly known as the Flora Stadion and commonly called the Frank Essed Stadion, is a multi-purpose stadium in Paramaribo, Suriname. It is home to Leo Victor Cosmos, Royal '95, and Super Red Eagles. It is also the home stadium of SNL, the football club of the national military of Suriname. The stadium was named after Surinamese politician and forestry scientist Frank Essed.

Location
The Frank Essed Stadium is located in Southwestern part of Paramaribo, in the Flora neighborhood. It is next door to the National Indoor Stadium on the west end of the Jaggernath Lachmonstraat.

Concerts
The Essed Stadium has been used as a location for several concerts.

References

Football venues in Paramaribo
S.V. Leo Victor
Sportvereniging Nationaal Leger
Athletics (track and field) venues in Suriname
Multi-purpose stadiums in Suriname
Buildings and structures in Paramaribo
Sports venues completed in 1958
1958 establishments in Suriname